Richard Orlowski is a Polish-American soccer coach.

Career

Playing

In his native Poland, Orlowski played as a forward for clubs such as Gofabet Gorzkowice, Piotrcovia Piotrków Trybunalski and WKS Grunwald Poznań. Later, in 1984, he fled to Austria to escape from the political regression and the Soviet subjugation of his home country. He was then granted refugee status in New York, anglicized his name from Ryszard Orłowski to Richard, and settled in Pennsylvania. While living in the United States, he played for a succession of Polish-American teams and even had a stint in the Cayman Islands.

Nepal

Orlowski was selected as Nepal national football team assistant coach along with Polish-American Jack Stefanowski- who was head coach.
Their best result was a 2-1 victory over India in the 2013 SAFF Championship, before getting knocked out by Afghanistan en route to the final.

Anguilla

Orlowski was assigned the Anguilla head coach role in 2015, taking ownership of a team composed of construction workers, bankers, teachers, and boat builders. During his time there, he brought increased professionalism and tactical intuition to the country. Also, he recorded three friendly wins- two against the British Virgin Islands and one versus a non-FIFA nation, Saint Martin by galvanizing the players with the possibility of moving up the World Rankings into performing well. Those three triumphs were Anguilla's first wins in the space of fourteen years.

But when the FIFA World Rankings were updated, Anguilla had not received any points even though the British Virgin Islands were a FIFA nation. FIFA never rectified the error and, when Anguilla had to play Nicaragua for a 2018 World Cup qualifier, they lost twice on a combined score of 8-0; Orlowski resigned after eight months in charge.

Belize

Assigned Belize manager ahead of the 2017 Copa Centroamericana, he led the Jaguars to a 0-0 draw with Panama in their opening fixture. However, his team lost all their remaining group stage matches after that. His main ambition for the national team is to get youth involved in soccer at a much younger age and also wants more friendlies against better opposition as it would be beneficial to the teams chemistry and quality of play.

He is also involved with the youth sides of the Belize national team from the under-15 level. On account of this, he has drafted some younger players into the senior squad.

References

External links
 Interview

American soccer coaches
1957 births
Living people
Footballers from Łódź
Polish footballers
Polish expatriate footballers
American expatriate soccer coaches
Association football forwards
Polish defectors
Polish emigrants to the United States
Expatriate footballers in the Cayman Islands
Expatriate football managers in Nepal
Expatriate football managers in Anguilla
Expatriate football managers in Belize
Belize national football team managers
Anguilla national football team managers
American expatriate sportspeople in Anguilla
American expatriate sportspeople in Belize
American expatriate sportspeople in the Cayman Islands
American expatriate sportspeople in Nepal
Polish expatriate football managers